William Cornelius Hasbrouck (August 23, 1800 – November 5, 1870 Newburgh, Orange County, New York) was an American lawyer and politician.

Life
He was the first child born to Cornelius Benjamin Hasbrouck (1769–1851) and Jane Kelso Hasbrouck (1774–1836). He was baptized at the New Hurley Reformed Church in Shawangunk, Ulster County, New York. William's two siblings were Benjamin Cornelius Hasbrouck (b. 1803) and Margaret Hasbrouck (b. 1803).

William C. Hasbrouck graduated from Union College in Schenectady and lived for a time in Franklin, Tennessee, where he served as Principal of the academy founded by Bishop Otey. After returning to the North, he briefly worked as Principal of the Farmer's Hall Academy in Goshen in the early 1820s and then studied law with various lawyers in Newburgh, and was admitted to the bar in 1826.

Hasbrouck was Trustee of Newburgh from 1835–1839, and lieutenant and later captain of a local militia at Newburgh called The Village Guard.

He was a Whig member from Orange County of the New York State Assembly, and was Speaker in 1847. In Newburgh, he practiced law with attorney James Taylor, operating under Hasbrouck & Taylor. They apprenticed many young men, including William Fullerton.

William Hasbrouck was a descendant of the Hasbroucks who founded New Paltz, located in New York's Hudson Valley, in 1678.  The Hasbroucks were Huguenots, Protestant followers of John Calvin who fled what is today Northern France and South Belgium who fled persecution by the ruling Catholics.  The original settlement of their ancestors survives today as Historic Huguenot Street, a National Historic Landmark District.

On June 28, 1831, William married Mary Elizabeth Roe (1811–1907), daughter of William Roe (1781–1868) and Maria Hazard Roe (1787—1877). William Roe, a retired grocer, gifted Hasbrouck the adjoining property to his mansion in Newburgh. A Tuscan-style villa was built. Between 1833 and 1853, William and Mary had nine children: William Hazard Hasbrouck, Maria Hazard Hasbrouck, Mary Roe Ann Hasbrouck, BG Henry Cornelius Hasbrouck, Emily Ann Hasbrouck, Mary Elizabeth Hasbrouck, Cornelia Jennette Hasbrouck, Blandina Hasbrouck, and Roe Hasbrouck.

Further reading 
 Obituary in NYT on November 9, 1870
 His widow's death notice in NYT on May 19, 1907
 Photos of his villa at Historic American Buildings Survey
 His son Henry's obituary in NYT on December 19, 1910

References

External links
Historic Huguenot Street
Hasbrouck Family Association

1800 births
1870 deaths
New York (state) Whigs
19th-century American politicians
Speakers of the New York State Assembly
Members of the New York State Assembly
Hasbrouck family
Politicians from Newburgh, New York
People from Franklin, Tennessee
Union College (New York) alumni
Military personnel from New York (state)
New York (state) lawyers
19th-century American lawyers